The 2019 Judo Grand Prix was held in Budapest, Hungary, from 12 to 14 July 2019.

Medal summary

Men's events

Women's events

Source Results

Medal table

References

External links
 

2019 IJF World Tour
2019 Judo Grand Prix
Judo
Grand Prix 2019
Judo
July 2019 sports events in Hungary